The Autonomous University of Sinaloa is a Mexican public university based in the city of Culiacán, Sinaloa, but with several campuses across the state.

References

Autonomous University of Sinaloa
Educational institutions established in 1873
1873 establishments in Mexico